"Futsal Shuffle 2020", or simply titled "Futsal Shuffle" is a song by American rapper Lil Uzi Vert. It was released through Generation Now and Atlantic Records as the lead single from their second studio album, Eternal Atake on December 13, 2019. The song features three sound clips, including two of their interviews with Nardwuar during Breakout Winter Festival and Rolling Loud Festival in Vancouver, British Columbia and Miami, Florida, respectively, as well as from Tyler, the Creator's performance of "Boredom" at the 2019 Camp Flog Gnaw. The song debuted at number 5 on the Billboard Hot 100, outpeaking "XO Tour Llif3" as Vert's highest charting single on the chart as a solo artist.
The song itself has also inspired a dance based on the song with the same title.

Background and promotion
On November 30, 2019, the rapper teased the release by sharing a preview that shows them dancing to the song on their social media. They called the dance the "Futsal Shuffle". They predicted the dance to "takeover 2020".

Critical reception
Tony M. Centeno at XXL described the song as an "upbeat banger" with a production "that incorporates EDM synths over a bass-heavy loop". Joshua Espinoza of Complex saw it as "a quintessential Uzi track" while lyrically, the track "delivers cocky lines about private jets, money, designer labels, and stealing other dudes' girls". Billboards Lars Brandle thought the song "pours old school rave notes over the Philadelphia rapper's taut wordplay (and occasional gunshots)".

Music video
An official video, directed by Jay Weneta, was released on January 6, 2020. In it, Lil Uzi Vert and their friends perform the song's titular "Futsal Shuffle" dance. The video includes scenes with "vibrant visual effects, including slow-motion touches, random bursts of fireworks and brief flashes of a dancing anime character".

Charts

Weekly charts

Year-end charts

Certifications

References

2019 songs
2019 singles
Lil Uzi Vert songs
Atlantic Records singles
Warner Records singles
Novelty and fad dances
Songs written by Lil Uzi Vert
Trap music songs
Snap songs
American dance songs